Solanum chilense is a plant species from the "tomato"  subgenus Lycopersicon within the nightshade genus Solanum.

Description
Solanum chilense is a robust, perennial, herbaceous plant that at first grows erect, later lying. It is found on rocky sites. The dense, velvety coat consists of white, single row, non-glandular trichomes up to 0.5 mm in length and occasional short-row, glandular trichomes with four or achtzelligen heads.

The sympodial units have two (rarely three) leaves. The internodes are 1–2 (rarely 5) cm long. The leaves are broken imparipinnate, (often only 5 to) 7 to 13 (rarely to 20) cm long and (rarely 2) 2.5 to 6.5 (rarely to 10) cm wide. They are greyish green. The coat is similar to the stem, but with less glandular trichomes.

The sheath consists of five to seven pairs of bulk leaves which are narrowly elliptical in shape, a broad-pointed to pointed tip, and inclined to appear sessile.

Leaves
Between the upper and lower parts of the leaves, there is no appreciable difference in size.

The base of the leaf stalks down. Between the main part of the profile, leaves are usually in two pairs about 10 to 20 inserted part flakes.

Distribution and ecology
The species occurs on the western slopes of the Tacna region of the Andes in southern Peru to northern Chile. The flowers and fruits appear consistently throughout the year, but there is a noticeable increase in flowering between September and October.

Further reading
 Iris E. Peralta, David M. Spooner, Sandra Knapp: Taxonomy of Wild Tomatoes and Their Relatives (.. Solanum sect Lycopersicoides, Juglandifolia sect, sect Lycopersicon, Solanaceae.). Systematic Botany Monographs, Volume 84, The American Society of Plant taxonomists, June 2008,

References

chilense